Chist is a settlement located in Maladzyechna District, Minsk Region, Belarus. The population is 5,422 (2010 estimate).

History 
Chist was founded in 1955 as a work settlement attached to the local peat mining factory, which was active until 1980s, before the peat run out. Since late 1980s the town is primarily known as a location of Zabudova, one of the biggest building material manufacturings in Belarus.

References

External links 
 Chist at tut.by

Populated places established in 1955
Urban-type settlements in Belarus
Populated places in Minsk Region
Maladzyechna District
1955 establishments in Belarus